Weso is an unincorporated community and railroad siding in Humboldt County, Nevada, United States located northeast of Winnemucca at the junction of the Winnemucca, Nevada and Elko Subdivisions of the Union Pacific Railroad.

Located nearby across the railroads is the Winnemucca Trap Club shooting range.

History

In  1940, the population of Weso was 15.

Both Southern Pacific Transportation Company and Western Pacific Railroad operated railroads through Northern Nevada, with stations in Weso, with both operating independently until their acquisitions by Union Pacific Railroad in 1996 and 1982 respectively. The tracks are also currently used by Amtrak's California Zephyr.

References

Unincorporated communities in Nevada
Unincorporated communities in Humboldt County, Nevada
Union Pacific Railroad stations